Aoti Zhongxin (Olympic Sports Center) station is a station on Line 8 of the Beijing Subway.

It is the nearest station to the National Olympic Sports Center, and is therefore decorated with sports elements.

Station layout 
The station has an underground island platform.

Exits 
There are 4 exits, lettered B1, B2, C, and D. Exit C is accessible.

References 

Beijing Subway stations in Chaoyang District